Soraon is a town and one of eight Tehsil of Allahabad district in the Indian state of Uttar Pradesh. Soraon Tehsil consist of 404 villages/Gram Panchayats. Muhammadpur Hathigahan being most populous Gram Panchayat and Pabnah and Uthgi being least populous gram panchayat among all.

Soraon is a Tehsil of Allahabad District in Uttar Pradesh. Soraon is also constituency of former Prime Minister of India Vishwanath Pratap Singh. He got elected as INC MLA in Uttar Pradesh Vidhan Sabha Election 1969 beating Ram Adhar Pande of Samyukta Socialist Party by 1088 votes.
Satyaveer Munna. After being declared as reserve constituency in 2009 he got elected for the first time from reserve constituency Soraon as SP MLA in Uttar Pradesh Vidhan Sabha Election 2012 beating Babulal Bhawara of Bahujan Samaj Party by over 14000 votes.

References

Cities and towns in Allahabad district